Equipment most commonly refers to a set of tools or other objects commonly used to achieve a particular objective. Different jobs require different kinds of equipment.

Types of equipment
Types of equipment include:

See also 
 
 
 
 :Category:Equipment

References